FC Spartak Vladikavkaz was a Russian football team from Vladikavkaz. It should not be confused with a former Russian Premier League champion FC Alania Vladikavkaz, which was known as FC Spartak Vladikavkaz for several periods in their history. It played professionally from 1993 to 2000, their best result was 4th place in Zone 1 of the Russian Second Division in 1993.

Team name history
 1992: FC Stroitel Vladikavkaz
 1993–2000: FC Iriston Vladikavkaz
 2001–2007: FC Vladikavkaz
 2008: FC Spartak Vladikavkaz

External links
  Team history at KLISF

Association football clubs established in 1992
Association football clubs disestablished in 2009
Defunct football clubs in Russia
Sport in Vladikavkaz
1992 establishments in Russia
2009 disestablishments in Russia